Ilhéus/Bahia-Jorge Amado Airport , is the airport serving Ilhéus, Brazil. Since March 12, 2002 it is named after the writer Jorge Amado de Faria (1912–2001), who was born in the nearby city of Itabuna.

It is administrated by Socicam.

History
The history of air transportation in Ilhéus is almost as old as the one of Brazil. In the 1930s, seaplanes of Syndicato Condor used to land at Ilhéus on their routes linking cities of the Brazilian coast. In 1939 the airport, then called Aeroporto do Pontal, was opened. The runway was paved in 1950.

Airlines and destinations

Access

See also

List of airports in Brazil

References

External links

Airports in Bahia
Airports established in 1939
Ilhéus